Robert Denis Glaser (born January 16, 1962 in New York City, New York) is the founder of RealNetworks, which produces RealAudio, RealVideo, RealPlayer, and Helix, among other products and services. Before founding RealNetworks, he had become a millionaire by working for Microsoft for ten years.

Glaser, while Chief Executive of RealNetworks, clashed repeatedly with Tony Fadell, widely known as the Godfather of the iPhone and iPod, who then left the company after 6 weeks and went on to founding the products for Apple.

Glaser is a graduate of Yale University with an BS degree in Computer Science and an MA in Economics.

On June 16, 2004, Glaser received the Music Visionary Award, along with EMI Vice Chairman David Munns, from the Music for Youth Foundation, and the United Jewish Appeal.

Glaser was the 22nd largest individual donor to 527 groups in the 2004 US election, donating over $2.2 million to pro-Democratic organizations.  He was the leading creditor to Air America Radio, loaning at least $9.8 million according to its bankruptcy filing. In addition, along with economist Jeffrey Sachs and public health expert Josh Ruxin, Glaser founded the Access Project, an NGO dedicated to improving health care in Rwanda by increasing management capacity at health centers.  In 1999, Glaser established the Glaser Progress Foundation, "to build a more just, sustainable and humane world." From 2011 to 2015, foundation assets have shrunk from $9 million to $5.7 million; annual grants have shrunk from $1.5 million to $267,000; overhead and expenses have grown slightly from $455,000 to $525,000. In 2016, he set up a web site (PutinTrump.org) to monitor and report then-candidate Donald Trump's connections to Vladimir Putin.

Since June 2010, Glaser has been a partner at global venture firm, Accel Partners, focusing on digital media technology, social media, and mobile service investments. He returned to RealNetworks again as interim CEO in 2012 and resumed the official title of CEO in 2014.

References

External links
 No. 41 Rob Glaser: Bit Streamer - Time Digital Top 50 (1999)
 Rob Glaser, Moving Target - interview by Randall Rothenberg writing for Wired Magazine (August 1999)
 RealNetwork's CEO Rob Glaser - interview by Lance Ulanoff writing for PC Magazine (April 21, 2003)
 
 Free Fall Radio: Air America Goes Bankrupt - Page 3 of the Chapter 11 filing from The Smoking Gun (October 13, 2006)
 Rethinking Mobile Data Plans - On the Hot Seat with Rob Glaser - interview by Sue Marek for FierceMobileContent (December 18, 2007)
 Big Audio Dynamite - biographical interview with Steve Homer in the Independent Newspaper (February 7, 2000)

1962 births
Air America (radio network)
Living people
20th-century American Jews
American technology executives
Microsoft employees
Yale University alumni
21st-century American Jews